This is a list of years in Finland.

16th century

17th century

18th century

19th century

20th century

21st century

See also
 Timeline of Helsinki
List of years by country

Further reading

External links
 

 
Finland history-related lists
Finland